Khaduly or Khaduli is a village in Ullahpara Upazila, Sirajgonj District, Bangladesh.

References

Sirajganj District
Populated places in Rajshahi Division